George Anderson Revercomb (October 18, 1858 – January 8, 1937) was an American politician who served as a member of the Virginia Senate. He ran for Congress in Virginia's 10th congressional district in 1904 and 1914. His son, Chapman Revercomb was a United States Senator from West Virginia.

References

External links
 

1858 births
1937 deaths
Republican Party Virginia state senators
20th-century American politicians